Pelycosaur is an older term for basal or primitive Late Paleozoic synapsids, excluding the therapsids and their descendants. Previously, the term mammal-like reptile had been used, and pelycosaur was considered an order, but this is now thought to be incorrect, and seen as outdated.

Because it excludes the advanced synapsid group Therapsida, the term is paraphyletic and contrary to modern formal naming practice. Thus the name pelycosaurs, similar to the term mammal-like reptiles, had fallen out of favor among scientists by the 21st century, and is only used informally, if at all, in the modern scientific literature. The terms stem mammals, protomammals, and basal or primitive synapsids are used where needed, instead.

Etymology
The term pelycosaur has been fairly well abandoned by paleontologists because it no longer matches the features that distinguish a clade. The modern word was created from Greek  meaning 'wooden bowl' or 'axe' and  meaning 'lizard'.

Pelycosauria is a paraphyletic taxon because it excludes the therapsids. For that reason, the term is sometimes avoided by proponents of a strict cladistic approach. Eupelycosauria is used to designate the clade that includes most pelycosaurs, along with the Therapsida and Mammalia. In contrast to "pelycosaurs", Eupelycosauria is a proper monophyletic group. Caseasauria is a pelycosaur side-branch, or clade, that did not leave any descendants.

Evolutionary history

The pelycosaurs appear to have been a group of synapsids that have direct ancestral links with the mammals, having differentiated teeth and a developing hard palate. The pelycosaurs appeared during the Late Carboniferous and reached their apex in the early part of the Permian, remaining the dominant land animals for some 40 million years. A few continued into the Capitanian, but they experienced a sharp decline in diversity in the late Kungurian. They were succeeded by the therapsids.

Description

Well-known pelycosaurs include the genera Dimetrodon, Sphenacodon, Edaphosaurus, and Ophiacodon.

Pelycosaur fossils have been found mainly in Europe and North America, although some small, late-surviving forms are known from Russia and South Africa.

Unlike lepidosaurian reptiles, pelycosaurs lacked reptilian epidermal scales. Fossil evidence from some varanopids shows that parts of the skin were covered in rows of osteoderms, presumably overlain by horny scutes. The belly was covered in rectangular scutes, looking like those present in crocodiles. Parts of the skin not covered in scutes might have had naked, glandular skin like that found in some mammals. Dermal scutes are also found in a diverse number of extant mammals with conservative body types, such as in the tails of some rodents, sengis, moonrats, the opossums and other marsupials, and as regular dermal armour with underlying bone in the armadillo.

At least two pelycosaur clades independently evolved a tall sail, consisting of elongated vertebral spines: the edaphosaurids and the sphenacodontids. In life, this would have been covered by skin, and likely functioned as a thermoregulatory device or as a mating display.

Taxonomy

In phylogenetic nomenclature, "Pelycosauria" is not used formally, since it does not constitute a group of all organisms descended from some common ancestor (a clade), because the group specifically excludes the therapsids which are descended from pelycosaurs. Instead, it represents a paraphyletic "grade" of basal synapsids leading up to the clade Therapsida.

In 1940, the group was reviewed in detail, and every species known at the time described, with many illustrated, in an important monograph by Alfred Sherwood Romer and Llewellyn Price.

In traditional classification, the order Pelycosauria is paraphyletic in that the therapsids (the "higher" synapsids) have emerged from them. That means Pelycosauria is a grouping of animals that does not contain all descendants of its common ancestor, as is often required by phylogenetic nomenclature. In evolutionary taxonomy, Therapsida is a separated order from Pelycosauria, and mammals (having evolved from therapsids) are separated from both as their own class. This use has not been recommended by a majority of systematists since the 1990s, but several paleontologists nevertheless continue using this word.

The following classification was presented by Benton in 2004.

 Order Pelycosauria*
 Family Eothyrididae
 Family Caseidae
 Family Varanopidae
 Family Ophiacodontidae
 Family Edaphosauridae
 Family Sphenacodontidae
 '''Order Therapsida

See also
 Evolution of mammals
 List of pelycosaurs
 Vertebrate paleontology

Notes

References

External links

 
 

Synapsids
Paraphyletic groups